Salicornia neei is a species of flowering plant in the family Amaranthaceae, native to Venezuela, the Galápagos, mainland Ecuador to South Brazil and Southern South America. It was first described in 1817.

References

neei
Flora of Argentina
Flora of Bolivia
Flora of South Brazil
Flora of Chile
Flora of Ecuador
Flora of the Galápagos Islands
Flora of the Juan Fernández Islands
Flora of Peru
Flora of Venezuela
Plants described in 1817